Dirk Bram Tuinzing (born 2 August 1948) is a retired Dutch rower. He competed at the 1972 Summer Olympics in the eight event and finished in ninth place.

References

1948 births
Living people
Dutch male rowers
Olympic rowers of the Netherlands
Rowers at the 1972 Summer Olympics
Sportspeople from The Hague